Granadina is a Spanish breed of goat. It is one of the olderst livestock breeds of Spain, being mentioned in 15th century sources. Its milk-producing characteristics were documented in 1893 and it was officially recognized in 1933. However, since 1975, it is considered a variety of the Murciano-granadina goat, which is a cross between the Murciana goat and the Granadina goat. Only the Murciano-granadina breed is officially recognized by the Government of Spain. Murciano-granadina goats have become the primary milk-producing goat breed in Spain, while the Granadina variety is rare. Its first germplasm bank was created in 2010 to combat its loss of genetic diversity.

References

Goat breeds originating in Spain
Dairy goat breeds